Motherly is a 2021 Canadian psychological horror thriller film directed by Craig David Wallace. The film stars Lora Burke as Kate, a woman who lives an isolated cabin with her daughter Beth (Tessa Kozma) after her husband is sent to prison for the death of a young girl; one day, however, the dead girl's parents (Kristen MacCulloch and Nick Smyth) show up demanding answers because they believe Kate was the real killer.

The film premiered on August 26, 2021 at the London FrightFest Film Festival, and was screened at several other Canadian and international film festivals before being released on VOD on November 16, 2021.

Spencer Creaghan received a Canadian Screen Award nomination for Best Original Score at the 10th Canadian Screen Awards in 2022.

Plot
Mother Kate lives in seclusion with her 9 year old daughter, Beth. A police officer, Hal, periodically checks in on both. Beth hopes for her father, Brad, to come for her ninth birthday.

Brad has committed suicide in prison after he is sentenced there for the murder of Beth's friend Courtenay two years prior. One evening two people, husband and wife Lewis and Mary break in. They are the parents of Courtenay, and they believe the evidence pointing to Brad makes no sense and it's revealed Brad and Mary has an affair. Hal checks in and sees Lewis about to kill Kate, who is confessing to implicating Brad, and shoots him and Kate kills Hal for learning the truth.

Mary incapacitates Kate and takes Beth but Kate then escapes and kills Mary. Beth is ultimately revealed as a psychopath and Courtenay's actual killer, with Kate setting Brad up to protect her daughter. Beth stabs her mother and says she's avenging her father's death and she leaves.

As credits roll a stranger sees Beth walking and asks if she needs help upon seeing her bloody outfit while Beth grins slightly.

Cast and characters
 Lora Burke as Kate
 Tessa Kozma as Beth
 Kristen MacCulloch as Mary
 Nick Smyth as Lewis
 Colin Paradine as Hal

Release
Motherly had its world premiere at the London FrightFest Film Festival on August 26, 2021, and was released on VOD by Entertainment Squad Video on November 16, 2021.

Reception

Box office
Motherly grossed $0 in North America and $117,226 in other territories.

Critical response
The review aggregator website Rotten Tomatoes reported a 86% approval rating, with an average score of 6.6/10, based on 7 reviews.

References

External links

2021 films
2021 horror thriller films
2020s English-language films
2020s Canadian films
Canadian psychological thriller films
English-language Canadian films
Home invasions in film